Avadhnama is a popular Urdu language newspaper serving major cities in the region of Awadh in India, including the cities of Lucknow, Aligarh, Faizabad, and Azamgarh. The paper is available both in print and online.

See also
List of newspapers in India

References

Further reading
 

Daily newspapers published in India
Newspapers published in Uttar Pradesh
Urdu-language newspapers published in India
Mass media in Lucknow
Mass media in Faizabad
Year of establishment missing